Bischofsmais is a municipality in the district of Regen, in Bavaria, Germany.  It is well known for winter sports, especially cross-country skiing.

References

Regen (district)